According to the Japanese Ministry of Justice, the number of foreign residents in Japan has steadily increased in the post Second World War period, and the number of foreign residents (excluding illegal immigrants and short-term foreign visitors and tourists staying more than 90 days in Japan) was more than 2.76 million at the end of 2022. With an estimated population of 125.57 million in 2020, the resident foreign population in Japan amounts to approximately 2.29% of the total population.

History

Due to geographic remoteness and periods of self-imposed isolation, the immigration, cultural assimilation and integration of foreign nationals into mainstream Japanese society has been comparatively limited. Historian Yukiko Koshiro has identified three historically significant waves of immigration prior to 1945; the 8th-century settlement of Korean artists and intellectuals; the asylum offered to a small number of Chinese families in the 1600s; and the forced immigration of up to 670,000 Korean and Chinese laborers during the Second World War.

After 1945, unlike the Gastarbeiter immigration encouraged in advanced industrial economies such as Germany, Japan was for the greater part able to rely on internal pools of rural labor to satisfy the manpower needs of industry. The demands of small business owners and demographic shifts in the late 1980s, however, gave rise for a limited period to a wave of tacitly accepted illegal immigration from countries as diverse as the Philippines and Iran.

Production offshoring in the 1980s also enabled Japanese firms in some labor-intensive industries such as electronic goods manufacture and vehicle assembly to reduce their dependence on imported labor. In 1990, new government legislation provided South Americans of Japanese ancestry such as Japanese Brazilians and Japanese Peruvians with preferential working visa immigration status. By 1998, there were 222,217 Brazilian nationals registered as residents in Japan with additional smaller groups from Peru. In 2009, with economic conditions less favorable, this trend was reversed as the Japanese government introduced a new program that would incentivize Brazilian and Peruvian immigrants to return home with a stipend of $3000 for airfare and $2000 for each dependent.

As of the second half of 2015, with an increasingly elderly Japanese population and lack of manpower in key sectors such as construction, IT services and health care, Japanese politicians are again debating the need to expand temporary foreign labor pools, through the use of short-term trainee programs.

Current immigration statistics

Resident foreign nationals in Japan that are counted in immigration statistics of permanent residents and mid-long-term residents (granted resident visas for 12 months or more) include individuals and their registered dependents with:
 Special permanent resident status
 Permanent Resident status
 Status of Residence based on Status or Position (Descendants of Japanese nationals)  
 Individuals living in the country as registered spouses of Japanese nationals
 Individuals granted limited duration employment visas
 Individuals granted limited duration student or academic research visas
 Individuals on limited duration Technical Intern Training Program visas
 Registered refugee and asylum seekers

From 2013 published government reports, the proportion of foreign residents granted permanent resident status in Japan exceeded 30%. Although, if foreign residents granted  permanent resident status, spouses of Japanese nationals, fixed domicile residents (those of Japanese ancestry) and ethnic Koreans with residence in Japan are included, the number of resident foreigners granted permanent residence effectively exceeds 60%.

Japan receives a low number of immigrants compared to other G7 countries. This is consistent with Gallup data, which shows that Japan is an exceptionally unpopular migrant destination to potential migrants, with the number of potential migrants wishing to migrate to Japan 12 times less than those who wished to migrate to the US and 3 times less than those who wished to migrate to Canada, which roughly corresponds to the actual relative differences in migrant inflows between the three countries. Some Japanese scholars have pointed out that Japanese immigration laws, at least toward high-skilled migrants, are relatively lenient compared to other developed countries, and that the main factor behind its low migrant inflows is because it is a highly unattractive migrant destination compared to other developed countries. This is also apparent when looking at Japan's work visa programme for "specified skilled worker", which had less than 3,000 applicants, despite an annual goal of attracting 40,000 overseas workers.

Immigration to Japan by resident status

Special Permanent Resident

The published statistics on foreign nationals resident in Japan includes zainichi Koreans with tokubetsu eijusha Special permanent resident status 292,702.

Permanent Resident
Foreign nationals already long-term residents in Japan under another visa category such as a working visa or as the spouse of a Japanese national are eligible to apply for permanent residence status.  The granting of permanent residence status is at the discretion of the Immigration Bureau and dependent on satisfaction of a number of detailed criteria such as length of stay, ability to make an independent living, record of tax payments and documented contributions to Japan in terms of public service or professional activities. According to the Migrant Integration Policy Index, permanent residency laws were less stringent than those in the United States and the United Kingdom.

Immigration through marriage
International marriage migration used to represent as much as 25% of permanent migration flows to Japan, but this trend has been in decline since a peak in 2006. In the 1980s increasing numbers of Japanese men were registering marriages in Japan to women from China, Korea and the Philippines.

In 2006, according to data released by the Japanese Ministry of Health, Labour, and Welfare, 44,701 marriages, or 6.11% of all marriages registered in Japan were to a foreign national. In 2013, this number had fallen to 21,488 marriages or 3.25% of all marriages registered in Japan. Of the 21,488 international marriages registered in Japan in 2013, 15,442 or 71.77% were marriages involving a foreign bride, compared to 6,046 or 28.23% where the groom was non-Japanese.

Japan registered marriage statistics alone may not present a comprehensive picture of the numbers of international marriages in Japan as marriages registered overseas may also contribute to total immigrant spouse numbers. Once married, foreign spouses may also, if certain criteria are satisfied, change their visa status to Permanent Resident or other visa categories. 2012 Ministry of Justice data indicates that of all foreigners in Japan, 7.5% are resident in Japan under a visa designation as a spouse of a Japanese national.

Long term residents on limited duration employment
At in the end of June 2022 there were 2,760,635 foreigners residing in Japan. Of this number 1,181,203 were considered long-term, but non permanent residents; those granted visas for a duration of 12 months or more. The majority of long-term residents in Japan on limited duration work or study visas were from Asia. Chinese made up the largest portion of this group with 744,551, followed by Vietnamese with 476,346, and Koreans with 412,340. Filipino, Nepalese, Indonesian and Taiwanese long-term residents totaled 47,956, and those from other Asian countries totaled 554,246.

In 2022, Technical Intern Training Program visas account for nearly 327,689 of the number. Vietnamese made up the largest group with 160,563, followed by Chinese  with 37,4891, and Indonesians with 34,459.

Student visas 
According to the Japan Student Services Organization (JSSO), as of 2021, 242,444 international students are residing in Japan.  Chinese made up the largest portion of this group with 114,255, followed by Vietnamese with 49,469, and Nepalis with 18,825.

Refugees and asylum seekers
Japan is a signatory to the UN 1951 Refugee Convention as well as the 1967 Protocol. The country therefore has made a commitment to offer protection to people who seek asylum and fall into the legal definition of a refugee, and moreover, not to return any displaced person to places where they would otherwise face persecution.

Japan has historically been one of the world's most generous donors to refugee relief and resettlement programs overseas. In 2014 it was the world's 2nd largest financial contributor to UNHCR programs. Japanese diplomat Sadako Ogata served as the United Nations High Commissioner for Refugees from 1991–2000.

As of December 2015 Japan had 13,831 asylum applications under review. In 2016, more than 10,000 applications for refugee status in Japan were received and in the same year 28 asylum applications were approved. In 2015, more than 7,500 people applied for refugee status and 27 asylum applications were approved. In 2014, more than 5000 applications were made and 11 applications were approved. Recent low approval rates for asylum applications follow historic trends; in a 22-year period from 1982 to 2004, a total of 330 applications for asylum were approved, an average of 15 per year.

Whereas in Germany and Canada around 40% of asylum applications are approved, in Japan the number averages 0.2 percent. On occasion, where Japan has stopped short of granting official refugee status, a limited number of applicants have been granted permission to stay on humanitarian grounds. In 2016, 97 refugee applicants were granted permission to stay on this basis. Decisions on refugee status in Japan are often slow, and confirmation of deportation orders are not widely published. Resubmission of asylum claims by previously unsuccessful applicants often occurs.

Closure of asylum application legal loophole
Between 2010 and January 2018, a rise in the number of asylum seekers in Japan was attributed in part to a legal loophole related to the government administered Technical Intern Training Program. In 2015, 192,655 vocational trainees mainly from developing economies were working in Japan in factories, construction sites, farms, food processing and in retail. Although total numbers are small, following a change in rules in 2010, asylum applications jumped four-fold, fueled by asylum seekers from Nepal, Turkey and Sri Lanka. Rising numbers of vocational trainees reportedly made formal asylum applications in order to change employers and escape reported employment abuses and low pay. The government-backed vocational program allows trainees to work on either one or three year contracts. Although the chances of refugee status been granted in Japan are exceptionally small, asylum applicants were permitted to get a job six months after applying for refugee status and, significantly, to make their own choice of employer.

Permits enabling legal employment six months after application for refugee status were discontinued by the Justice Ministry in January 2018. Workplace inspections and illegal immigration deportation enforcement activities were subsequently stepped up aimed at curbing alleged abuse of the refugee application system.

Illegal immigration
According to Ministry of Justice (MOJ) estimates, the number of foreign nationals staying illegally in Japan beyond their authorized period of stay dropped to approximately 60,000 as of January 1, 2015. Illegal immigrant numbers had peaked at approximately 300,000 in May 1993, but have been gradually reduced through a combination of stricter enforcement of border controls, workplace monitoring and an expansion of government run foreign worker programs for those seeking a legal route to short term employment opportunities in Japan.

Border controls at ports of entry for foreign nationals include examination of personal identification documentation, finger printing and photo recording. Security at both air and maritime ports is closely controlled. As a result, according to MOJ data, the single largest source of illegal immigrants in Japan are those foreign nationals found to have stayed illegally beyond the 90 day time period of the temporary visitor visa.

Immigrant integration into Japanese society

Naturalisation
In 2015, 9,469 applications for Japanese citizenship were approved. The number of foreign residents in Japan applying to naturalize and obtain Japanese citizenship peaked in 2008 at more than 16,000, but declined to 12,442 in 2015. Processing of applications can take up to 18 months. Application criteria are set deliberately high and inspectors are granted a degree of discretion in interpretation of eligibility and good conduct criteria. Apart from the requirement to renounce foreign citizenship, naturalization criteria are similar to other developed countries such as the US, although there is no citizenship test. About 99 percent of naturalization applications in Japan are approved, compared to about 90 percent in the US.

Most of the decline in applications is accounted for by a steep reduction in the number of Japan-born Koreans taking Japanese citizenship. Historically the bulk of those taking Japanese citizenship have not been new immigrants but rather Special Permanent Residents; Japan-born descendants of Koreans and Taiwanese who remained in Japan at the end of the Second World War.

Ethnicity and nationality
Where the census of the United Kingdom, for example, separates ethnic or racial background from nationality, the Japanese Census and Statistics Bureau do not distinguish between the two.

In 2005, future Prime Minister Tarō Asō described Japan as being a nation of "one race, one civilization, one language and one culture" and in 2012, this claim was repeated by former Governor of Tokyo Shintaro Ishihara.

The concept of a unified minzoku retains a legal authority. A 1984 amendment to the Japanese Nationality Act made citizenship jus sanguinis, tied to blood rather than place of birth. Japanese citizenship is exclusive: those who naturalize must renounce their first nationality, and those who are born Japanese but with a second citizenship must choose between them by the time they are 20 years old.

Public opinion towards immigration
Overall, polls find that Japanese public opinion toward immigration is similar to other G7 countries. A 1999 review article of opinion polls show attitudes broadly neutral and less negative than other developed countries. 

In 1993, 64% of respondents supported allowing firms facing labor shortages to hire unskilled foreign workers. A 2017 poll by Gallup shows a similar attitude 24 years later, with Japan middling among developed countries in terms of public positivity towards immigration, ranking close to France, Belgium and Italy. In a Nikkei survey from 2019, 69% of respondents said an increase in foreigners was "good". Japanese who are college educated are almost 50% more likely to favor immigration for both economic and cultural reasons.

A 2019 Pew Research Center poll found Japanese respondents had more positive views of immigrants than respondents in most countries. Another Pew Research Center poll found Japanese respondents were the least likely to support a reduction in immigration, and among the most likely to support an increase in immigration, of the 27 countries surveyed.

A 2016 poll by the Asahi Shimbun found that 34% of its readers opposed an expansion of immigration to maintain Japan's economic status in the face of a shrinking and rapidly aging workforce, while 51% of its readers supported increased immigration. 

However, a large poll of 10,000 native Japanese conducted later that year, between October and December 2015, found more opposition to increasing foreign immigration. Over half of Asahi Shimbun's readers who responded to a 2016 poll said that immigrants should respect Japanese culture and obey Japanese customs, while about one quarter said that Japanese people should embrace diversity. On the other hand, one of the common arguments for restricting immigration is based on safeguarding security, including public order, protecting welfare mechanisms, cultural stability, or social trust.

See also
 Japanese diaspora - Information on historical and current migration trends from Japan.

References

External links

Points-based Preferential Immigration Treatment for Highly Skilled Foreign Professionals
Immigration Bureau
Immi-moj.go.jp
Permanent Residence in Japan: The Complete How-to Guide

 
Society of Japan